Mathieu Lanes (1660–1725 in Toulouse) was a French harpsichordist, organist and composer.

Life 
Almost nothing is known about him, except that he was organist and choir master of the Saint-Étienne Toulouse Cathedral at the beginning of the 18th century.

Works 
He is known by a 134-page manuscript entitled Petites Pièces d'orgue de M. Lanes (1710–1722), with 90 anonymous parts for the organ, and harpsichord pieces by François Couperin. (Le Rossignol en amour, Double du Rossignol en amour, Fanfare pour la suite de Diane, La Voluptueuse), kept at the Library of the municipal conservatory of Toulouse (Res. Mus. Cons. 943).

Some pieces such as the Gavote, the Rondeau, the Piémontoise and the Sonata in G major were likely to be played on the harpsichord.

Modern reprints 
 Petites pièces d’orgue de Mathieu Lanes, ed. Norbert Dufourcq, Roger Hugon, Janine Alaux and Roberte Machard. Paris: , Heugel, 1970. - XVII-91 p.

Discography 
 France Orgue discography by Alain Cartayrade.

See also 
 French organ school

References

External links 
 Bibliothèque de Toulouse Fac-simile of the manuscript.
 Symétrie Extracts of the edition by Dufourcq.
 YouTube Pastór de Lasala performs a Élévation from Mathieu Lanes's book on the historical organ (1680) of Notre-Dame de Rozay-en-Brie.
 IMSLP All organ and harpsichord scores.

French Baroque composers
Composers for harpsichord
French classical organists
French male organists
1660 births
1725 deaths
17th-century male musicians
Male classical organists